Yeonje District is a gu in central Busan, South Korea. It has an area of 12.08 km², and a population of about 220,000. Yeonje-gu was created in March 1995 following its separation from Dongnae-gu. Its name was formed by taking the first and last syllables of the names of its only 2 legal dong; Yeonsan-Dong and Geoje-Dong. Busan City Hall is located in Yeonje-gu.

Administrative divisions

Yeonje-gu is divided into 2 legal dong, which all together comprise 12 administrative dong, as follows:

Yeonsan-dong (8 administrative dong)
Geoje-dong (4 administrative dong)

See also
Geography of South Korea
Subdivisions of South Korea

References

External links

 Yeonje-gu website 

 
Districts of Busan